Earl  was a Japanese forester, Imperial Japanese Army second lieutenant, politician, educator, and Shintō priest. His court rank was Junior Third Rank.

Back ground
Tokugawa graduated from the Department of Forestry, Faculty of Agriculture of the Tokyo Imperial University with a Doctorate of Agriculture.

Tokugawa was a recipient of the Order of the Sacred Treasure 1st class, Grand Cordon. In 1989 he posthumously received the highest distinction of the Scout Association of Japan, the Golden Pheasant Award.

References

External links

Scouting in Japan
1897 births
Recipients of the Order of the Sacred Treasure
1989 deaths